Lacydes is a genus of tiger moths in the family Erebidae erected by Francis Walker in 1855.

Species
 Lacydes spectabilis (Tauscher, 1806)
 Lacydes incurvata Ebert, 1973

References

Callimorphina
Moth genera